There are two former electoral districts called Normanby:

 Electoral district of Normanby (Queensland)
 Electoral district of Normanby (Victoria)